John McLenan (1827–1865) was an American illustrator and caricaturist. Active from 1852 to 1865, his works include illustrations of Charles Dickens' A Tale of Two Cities and Great Expectations for Harper's Weekly (1859 - 1861) and illustrations for two Wilkie Collins novels. Author Sinclair Hamilton wrote of McLenan
Discovered by DeWitt C. Hitchcock working in a pork-packing establishment in Cincinnati and making drawings on the tops of barrels, McLenan became one of the most prolific of our [i. e., America's] early illustrators. . . . . He was also well known as a comic draftsman. His work will bear comparison with the best of his time.

Some of his cartoons make use of the text comics format, making him a pioneer in comics.

References

External links

 John McLenan — Illustrator for Harper's Weekly at Victoria Web
 
 
 John McLenan article on Lambiek Comiclopedia.

American illustrators
American caricaturists
American comics artists
1827 births
1865 deaths